Giordan Watson (born 24 October 1985) is an American-Romanian professional basketball player for Cluj of the Romanian Liga Națională. Standing at 178 cm (5 ft 10 in), Watson primarily plays as point guard. A naturalized Romanian, he also plays for the Romanian national basketball team.

Professional career
Watson spent the 2011–2012 season with Úrvalsdeild karla club Grindavík, helping them win the Icelandic Supercup, the Icelandic Company Cup, and the Icelandic championship.

On 27 June 2017, Watson signed with U BT Cluj-Napoca of the Romanian Liga Națională. He signed with CSM Oradea in 2018. Watson averaged 11.3 points and 3.7 assists per game in 2019-20. He re-signed with the team on June 29, 2020.

On July 16, 2021, he has signed with Cluj of the Romanian Liga Națională.

International career
In June 2017, Watson was selected for the first selection of players for the Romanian national basketball team, to play at EuroBasket 2017.

References

External links
RealGM.com profile
Úrvalsdeild profile

1985 births
Living people
American emigrants to Romania
American expatriate basketball people in Finland
American expatriate basketball people in France
American expatriate basketball people in Germany
American expatriate basketball people in Iceland
American expatriate basketball people in Romania
American expatriate basketball people in Turkey
American men's basketball players
Basketball players from Detroit
Central Michigan Chippewas men's basketball players
CS Energia Rovinari players
CS Universitatea Cluj-Napoca (men's basketball) players
CSM Oradea (basketball) players
Eisbären Bremerhaven players
Giants Nördlingen players
Grindavík men's basketball players
Kauhajoen Karhu players
Le Mans Sarthe Basket players
Njarðvík men's basketball players
Point guards
Romanian men's basketball players
Romanian people of African-American descent
Úrvalsdeild karla (basketball) players
Uşak Sportif players